Aïnoumane is a village which is part of the urban commune of Diouloulou in the Bignona Department of the Ziguinchor Region of south-western Senegal. In 2002 it had a population of 98 people.

References

Populated places in the Bignona Department